The Craven Plate is an Australian Turf Club Group 3 Thoroughbred horse race run over 2,000 metres, under Weight for Age conditions for three-year-olds and older, at Randwick Racecourse, Sydney, Australia.  Total prize money for the race is A$750,000.

History

    

The race has long been part of the AJC Spring Carnival and in the late 19th and early 20th century was considered one of the elite races. The race history of brilliant racehorses who have won this race - The Barb, Phar Lap, Peter Pan, Tim Whiffler, Carbine, Chatham, Windbag, Tulloch, Duke Foote, Prince Darius and Summer Fair.

Name
 1867–1999 - Craven Plate
 2000 - Queen's Cup
 2001 - Japan Trophy Race
 2002 onwards - Craven Plate

Grade
 1867–1978 - Principal Race
 1979–1983 - race was not held
 1984–1992 -  Listed race
 1993 onwards Group 3

Distance
 1867–1971 - 1 miles (~ 2000 metres)
 1972–2000 – 2000 metres
 2001 – 1800 metres
 2002 onwards - 2000 metres

1922 & 1942 racebooks

Gallery of noted winners

Winners

 2022 - Cascadian
 2021 - Think It Over
 2020 - Think It Over
2019 - Happy Clapper
2018 - Moss 'n' Dale
2017 - Classic Uniform
2016 - It's Somewhat
2015 - Complacent
2014 - Moriarty
2013 - Honorius
2012 - Mourayan
2011 - My Kingdom Of Fife
2010 - C'est La Guerre
2009 - Miss Marielle
2008 - Lorne Dancer
2007 - †race not held 
2006 - Cateclipse
2005 - Mummify
2004 - Fiery Venture
2003 - Shower Of Roses
2002 - Manner Hill
2001 - The Man
2000 - Yippyio
1999 - Tie The Knot
1998 - Sharscay
1997 - Yippyio
1996 - Adventurous
1995 - Stony Bay
1994 - Fraternity
1993 - Mahaya
1992 - Telesto
1991 - Lord Revenir
1990 - Dual Treasures
1989 - Sarah Fay
1988 - Balciano
1987 - Ostensible
1986 - Sotip
1985 - Hayai
1984 - Hayai
1979–83 - race not held
1978 - Ming Dynasty
1977 - Denise's Joy
1976 - Battle Heights
1975 - Dalrello
1974 - Leica Lover
1973 - Analie
1972 - Passetreul
1971 - Regal Rhythm
1970 - Planet Kingdom
1969 - Roman Consul
1968 - Prince Grant
1967 - Winfreux
1966 - Prince Grant
1965 - Strauss
1964 - Summer Regent
1963 - Summer Fair
1962 - Summer Fair
1961 - Nilarco 
1960 - Tulloch
1959 - Travel Boy
1958 - Prince Darius
1957 - Prince Darius
1956 - Caranna
1955 - Prince Cortauld
1954 - Prince Cortauld
1953 - Tarien
1952 - Hydrogen
1951 - Hydrogen
1950 - Playboy
1949 - Carbon Copy
1948 - Karachi
1947 - Russia
1946 - race not held
1945 - Flight
1944 - Tea Rose
1943 - Flight
1942 - Yaralla
1941 - Beau Vite
1940 - Beau Vite
1939 - High Caste
1938 - Young Idea
1937 - Talking
1936 - Gay Blonde
1935 - Peter Pan
1934 - Chatham
1933 - Chatham
1932 - Chatham
1931 - Phar Lap
1930 - Phar Lap
1929 - Phar Lap
1928 - Amounis
1927 - Limerick
1926 - Windbag
1925 - Windbag
1924 - Gloaming
1923 - Rivoli
1922 - Gloaming
1921 - Beauford
1920 - Greenstead
1919 - Gloaming
1918 - Cetigne
1917 - Biplane
1916 - Carlita
1915 - St. Carwyne
1914 - Woorak
1913 - Duke Foote
1912 - Duke Foote
1911 - Lady Medallist
1910 - Parsee
1909 - Maltine
1908 - Mooltan
1907 - Mountain King
1906 - Solution
1905 - Gladsome
1904 - Emir
1903 - Ibex
1902 - Wakeful
1901 - Hautvilliers
1900 - Paul Pry
1899 - Le Var
1898 - The Grafter
1897 - Delaware
1896 - Newhaven
1895 - Delaware
1894 - Patron
1893 - Loyalty
1892 - Bungebah
1891 - Marvel
1890 - Carbine
1889 - Abercorn
1888 - Abercorn
1887 - Trident
1886 - Trident
1885 - Nordenfeldt
1884 - Sir Modred
1883 - Legrand
1882 - Sting
1881 - Wellington
1880 - Sweetmeat
1879 - Baronet
1878 - Chester
1877 - Robinson Crusoe
1876 - Malta
1876 - Valentia
1875 - Kingsborough
1874 - Maid Of Avenel
1873 - Hamlet
1872 - Dagworth
1871 - Tim Whiffler
1870 - Tim Whiffler
1869 - Glencoe
1868 - The Barb
1867 - Yattendon

† Not held because of outbreak of equine influenza

See also
 List of Australian Group races
 Group races

References

Horse races in Australia
Open middle distance horse races
Randwick Racecourse